Gummidipoondi is a state assembly constituency in Tiruvallur district in Tamil Nadu. Its State Assembly Constituency number is 1. It consists of the Gummidipundi and Uthukkottai taluks. It falls under Thiruvallur Lok Sabha constituency. It is one of the 234 State Legislative Assembly Constituencies in Tamil Nadu.

Madras State

Tamil Nadu

Election results

2021

2016

2011

2006

2001

1996

1991

1989

1984

1980

1977

1971

1967

1962

1957

References 

 

Assembly constituencies of Tamil Nadu
Tiruvallur district